Sikuri (also Romanized as Sīḵūrī; also known as Sīgarī) is a village in Shusef Rural District, Shusef District, Nehbandan County, South Khorasan Province, Iran. At the 2006 census, its population was 46, divided among 11 families.

References 

Populated places in Nehbandan County